The Independent Workers' Party (POI) is a French Marxist political party founded in June 2008 after the dissolution of its predecessor, the Workers' Party. It claimed 10,071 members at its founding congress in 2008, and 8,000 members on its second congress in 2012.

Amongst its four General Secretaries are former presidential candidates Gérard Schivardi and Daniel Gluckstein.

See also
Politics of France
List of political parties in France

References

2008 establishments in France
Communist parties in France
Political parties established in 2008
Political parties of the French Fifth Republic
Trotskyist organizations in France